Carex gibba is a species of true sedge in the family Cyperaceae, native to Vietnam, southern and central China, Manchuria, the Korean Peninsula, and Japan. It is basal in its subgenus Vignea.

References

gibba
Flora of Vietnam
Flora of Southeast China
Flora of South-Central China
Flora of North-Central China
Flora of Manchuria
Flora of Korea
Flora of Japan
Plants described in 1803